The Comeback is a 2001 Italian independent drama film  written and directed by Franco Angeli.

For his performance Francesco Salvi was nominated for Silver Ribbon for best actor, while Angeli was nominated for Silver Ribbon for best new director.

Plot

Cast 
 Francesco Salvi as  Mario Gibellini
  Livia Bonifazi as  Teresa
 Nando Gazzolo as Chiodi
  Néstor Garay  as  Denti
 Flavio Insinna as  Bolognesi
  Pasquale Anselmo as  Ciamboli
  Franco Di Francescantonio as  Franchino

See also    
 List of Italian films of 2001

References

External links

2000s sports drama films
Italian sports drama films
Italian boxing films
Italian independent films
2001 independent films
2001 films
2000s Italian-language films
2000s Italian films